Andrews is an unincorporated community in Sioux County, Nebraska, United States.

History
A post office was established at Andrews in 1906, and remained in operation until it was discontinued in 1951. Sources on the etymology of the name differ. It was either named for J. W. Andrews, a railroad engineer, or for a pioneer settler.

References

Unincorporated communities in Sioux County, Nebraska
Unincorporated communities in Nebraska